Caesar Colclough (died 1726) was a Member of Parliament for Taghmon (Parliament of Ireland constituency).

References

Year of birth missing
1726 deaths
Members of the Parliament of Ireland (pre-1801) for County Wexford constituencies
Irish MPs 1715–1727